Ballycrovane Ogham Stone (CIIC 66) is an ogham stone and National Monument located in County Cork, Ireland.

Location

History

This is the tallest known Ogham stone, carved in the 4th–6th century AD.

Description

Ballycrovane Ogham Stone is a pillar of stone measuring 470 × 102 × 32 cm and has Ogham carvings incised on two edges.  (MAQI-DECCEDDAS AVI TURANIAS, "of Mac-Deichet Uí Thorna") is carved on it.

References

National Monuments in County Cork
Ogham inscriptions